The lepton, plural lepta, is the name of various fractional units of currency used in the Greek-speaking world from antiquity until today. The word means "small" or "thin", and during Classical and Hellenistic times a lepton was always a small value coin, usually the smallest available denomination of another currency.

The coin in the lesson of the widow's mite is referred to as a lepton and Luke's Gospel also refers to the lepton or mite when stating that a person who does not make peace with his adversary in good time will be required to pay 'to the very last mite' before being released from prison. In the Hasmonean Kingdom the lepton was first minted under Alexander Jannaeus prior to 76 BCE.

In modern Greece, lepton (modern form: lepto, λεπτό) is the name of the  denomination of all the official currencies of the Greek state: the phoenix (1827–1832), the drachma (1832–2001) and the euro (2002–current) – the name is the Greek form of "cent". Its unofficial currency sign is Λ (lambda). Since the late 1870s, and until the introduction of the euro in 2001, no Greek coin had been minted with a denomination lower than 5 lepta.

References

External links

Greek Lepta Coins Information

Coins of ancient Greece
Currencies of Europe
Coins in the Bible